Dhar State was a princely state. It was  a salute state in the colonial sway of the Central India Agency. Dhar began as one of the states during Maratha dominance in India about 1730. Dhar was the capital of the state since 1732 (from the 1728 foundation, the Raja's first seat had been at Multhan in Dhar district. In 1948, it became part of Madhya Bharat.

Lying between 21°57' and 23°15' north, and 74°37' and 75°37' east, Dhar State was bordered on the north by Ratlam State and Sailana State; east by parts of Gwalior and Indore States; on the south by Barwani State, and on the west by Jhabua State and portions of Gwalior State and Indore State.

Hemendra Singh Rao Pawar is the present ruler (titular) of Dhar.

History 

The present Dhar dynasty was founded in 1729 by Udaji Rao Puar, a distinguished Maratha general who received the territory as a grant from the Chatrapati.

Yeshwant Rao Puar also had prominent role in the northern expansion of the Maratha Empire. In the Third battle of Panipat (1761), Atai Khan, the adopted son of the Wazir Shah Wali Khan, was said to have been killed by Yeshwant Rao Pawar when he climbed atop his elephant and struck him down.

During the Pindhari raids, the state's territory was whittled away, until it was restored in size on 10 January 1819, when it signed a Subsidiary alliance agreement with the British East India Company and became a major Princely state, enjoying indirect rule under British protectorate.

The Dhar State Darbar (Court) was composed of Sardars, Jagirdars, Istamuradars, Mankaris, Thakurs and Bhumias.

The state was confiscated by the British after the Revolt of 1857. In 1860, it was restored to Raja Anand Rao III Pawar, then a minor, with the exception of the detached district of Bairusia which was granted to the Begum of Bhopal. Anand Rao, who received the personal title Maharaja and the KCSI in 1877, died in 1898; he was succeeded by Udaji Rao II Pawar.

Rulers

Titular Maharajas
2015–present : Hemendra Singh Rao Pawar

Postal/Philatelic information 
In 1897 primitive stamps with entirely native text. The second definitive issue bore the name DHAR STATE in Latin script; a total of 8 stamps. Since 1901 Indian stamps have been in use.

See also 
 Maratha Empire
 List of Maratha dynasties and states
 List of princely states of British India (alphabetical)
 Dewas Junior
 Dewas Senior

References

External links 
 

Maratha princely states
Princely states of Madhya Pradesh
Rajput princely states
Salute states
1730 establishments in India
1947 disestablishments in India
Dhar district
Former countries in South Asia
Former monarchies of South Asia
Former protectorates